Dumbrăvița (until 1960 Țânțari;) is a commune in Brașov County, Transylvania, Romania. It is composed of two villages, Dumbrăvița and Vlădeni (Wladein; Vledény).

This is the only place in Transylvania and one of the few places in Romania where the grey heron nests in reeds.

Dumbrăvița is bordered to the north by Crizbav commune, to the east by Hălchiu commune, to the south by the city of Codlea, and to the 
west by the Șinca and Părău communes.

The village of Vlădeni is traversed by the national road DN1, which runs from Bucharest to the border with Hungary.

At the 2011 census, 92.86% of inhabitants were ethnic Romanians and 3.2% Roma.

Natives
Dumitru Stăniloae

References

Communes in Brașov County
Localities in Transylvania
Burzenland